The Idaho State Journal is daily newspaper published in  Pocatello, Idaho, United States, that serves southeast Idaho, including Bannock, Bear Lake, Bingham, Caribou, Franklin, Power, and Oneida counties. The paper has a circulation of 17,116 daily (17,825 on Sundays) and is published by Travis Quast, with Ian Fennell as managing editor.

History
The periodical began it existence as a political publication in 1890, as the Pocatello Tribune. On January 6, 1893, it became a newspaper with a weekly printing. Over the ensuing years it increased publication to twice weekly, and then thrice weekly. In March 1897 a failed attempt was made to print daily editions. However, that endeavor became successful several years later and the newspaper has published daily since March 17, 1902.

On April 28, 1924, the Idaho State Journal began publication, but the Pocatello Tribune purchased that periodical in 1932. Thereafter, the Idaho State Journal continued as the morning edition of the Pocatello Tribune. However, due to the newsprint shortages during World War II, printing of the Idaho State Journal was suspended in 1942. Like many others newspapers, the Idaho State Journal changed ownership multiple times during its early existence.

The current Idaho State Journal became a reality on October 1, 1949, when it merged with another newspaper (the Pocatello Post), which had begun in 1947. By then, the newspaper was owned by the Scripps League Newspapers. After several changes in operating sites, the newspaper moved to its current location on South Arthur Avenue in 1951. Over three decades later, Scripps League Newspapers sold its interest in the newspaper to the Pioneer News Group in 1984. Another three decades later, the Pioneer New Group sold its papers to Adams Publishing Group in 2017.

See also
 List of newspapers in Idaho

References

External links

 
 Adams Publishing Group

Newspapers published in Idaho
Daily newspapers published in the United States
Newspapers established in 1890
Pocatello, Idaho
1890 establishments in Idaho